Wotton was a railway station at Wotton Underwood, Buckinghamshire, on the Great Central Railway's link line between  and Ashendon Junction.

History

The station was opened by the Great Central Railway on 2 April 1906, becoming part of the London and North Eastern Railway during the Grouping of 1923. It was built to the south of the point where the GCR crossed the Brill Tramway near its Wotton station. It was closed on 7 December 1953.

Notes

References

Service

External links
Station on navigable O.S. map

Former Great Central Railway stations
Disused railway stations in Buckinghamshire
Railway stations in Great Britain opened in 1906
Railway stations in Great Britain closed in 1953